The 1933 Women's Western Open was a golf competition held at Olympia Fields Country Club, the 4th edition of the event. June Beebe won the championship in match play competition by defeating Jane Weiller in the final match, 3 and 2.

Women's Western Open
Golf in Illinois
Women's Western Open
Women's Western Open
Women's Western Open
Women's sports in Illinois